Acemya oestriformis is a species of bristle fly in the family Tachinidae.

Distribution
Canada, United States.

References

Exoristinae
Diptera of North America
Insects described in 1891
Taxa named by Friedrich Moritz Brauer
Taxa named by Julius von Bergenstamm